Mihlali Samson "Mabhuti" Mayambela (born August 25, 1996) is a South African footballer who plays as a midfielder for Cypriot club Aris Limassol.

Career
Mayambela started out his youth career with Old Mutual Academy before also spending time at the two Johannesburg clubs Orlando Pirates and Kaizer Chiefs F.C. In 2014 and 2015 he played first team football with South African National First Division side Cape Town All Stars where he made 11 league appearances.

After trialing with the club for two weeks during the summer of 2015 Mayambela joined Swedish Allsvenskan side Djurgårdens IF  on a four year deal in January 2016. They had originally intended to sign him during the upcoming summer but due to injuries they decided to make the move six months earlier. On 28 March 2016 it was reported that the Welsh club Swansea City was tracking Mayambela.
On 24 August Mayambela scored his first goal for Djurgården, scoring one goal in the Swedish Cup qualifier 5-1 win against Smedby AIS.

In 2017, Mayambela was loaned out to Swedish second tier Superettan club Degerfors IF. Mayambela was loaned out once again in 2018, this time to newly promoted IK Brage in the same division.

On 19 July 2018, Mayambela was loaned out to Farense until the summer of 2019, with an option to buy.

On 28 January 2020 loaned the Israeli Premier League club Bnei Yehuda

In the year of 2022, he was transferred to Cypriot club Aris Limassol

Personal life
He is the younger brother of Mark Mayambela. His favourite football club is Kaizer Chiefs F.C.

References

External links
 
 
 

1996 births
South African soccer players
Living people
Djurgårdens IF Fotboll players
Degerfors IF players
IK Brage players
S.C. Farense players
Bnei Yehuda Tel Aviv F.C. players
Associação Académica de Coimbra – O.A.F. players
Aris Limassol FC players
Superettan players
Allsvenskan players
Liga Portugal 2 players
Israeli Premier League players
Cypriot First Division players
South African expatriate soccer players
Expatriate footballers in Sweden
Expatriate footballers in Portugal
Expatriate footballers in Israel
Expatriate footballers in Cyprus
South African expatriate sportspeople in Sweden
South African expatriate sportspeople in Portugal
South African expatriate sportspeople in Israel
South African expatriate sportspeople in Cyprus
Association football midfielders